Moncks Corner is a town in and the county seat of Berkeley County, South Carolina, United States. The population was 7,885 at the 2010 census. As defined by the U.S. Census Bureau, Moncks Corner is included within the Charleston-North Charleston-Summerville Metropolitan Statistical Area.

History
Settled by indigenous peoples for thousands of years, the area of Moncks Corner was occupied by the historic Edistow people, a sub-tribe of the Cusabo tribes. Its various bands shared a language distinct from that of the major language families in the present-day state: Algonquian, Siouan, and Iroquoian, including Cherokee. Although now extinct as a tribe, Etiwan, Edisto, Cherokee, and Catawba descendants make up the eight families of the Wassamasaw Tribe of Varnertown Indians, a community located between Moncks Corner and Summerville. The 1,500-member tribe were recognized by the state as an Indian Tribe in 2009.

During the colonial era, Moncks Corner became a major settlement area of French Protestant Huguenots, who came to South Carolina between 1684 and 1688 as refugees due to religious persecution in France. Many family surnames in Berkeley and adjacent counties are of French origin. The Huguenots soon began to intermarry with the English colonists.

The town of Moncks Corner dates back to 1728 and is named for landowner Thomas Monck, a slaveholder who branded his runaway slaves on their chest with his name "T Monck." The town began as a trading post with a few taverns and stores.  The Battle of Monck's Corner was fought here in 1780, associated with the Siege of Charleston.

The Northeastern Railroad, which ran between Charleston, South Carolina, and Siler City, North Carolina, laid its tracks in 1856, and the train depot became the center of the new town of Moncks Corner. The town of Moncks Corner was chartered on December 26, 1885, and incorporated December 15, 1909.

Moncks Corner was granted the trademark "Capital of Santee Cooper Country" by the South Carolina Secretary of State September 9, 1999, and again October 21, 2004. The trademark is a symbol of its abundant outdoor activities, such as horseback riding, hiking, water sports, boating and freshwater fishing. Moncks Corner is also the home of Santee Cooper's corporate office complex.

The Biggin Church Ruins, Cooper River Historic District, Lewisfield Plantation, Mulberry Plantation, Santee Canal, and Strawberry Chapel and Childsbury Town Site are listed on the National Register of Historic Places.

Geography
Moncks Corner is located near the center of Berkeley County at  (33.1966, -80.0067).

U.S. Route 52 is the main highway through the town, leading south  to Charleston and north  to Florence. U.S. Route 17 Alternate also passes through the town, leading east  to Georgetown and southwest  to Summerville. South Carolina Highway 6 leads northwest from Moncks Corner along the south and west sides of Lakes Moultrie and Marion  to Interstate 95 at Santee.

Climate

Moncks Corner is a humid subtropical climate(Cfa) according to the Köppen climate classification system. It is similar to Charleston in regards of the said climate, which Moncks Corner is a suburb of. However, due to the distance from the coast compared to Charleston, it is noticeably hotter in the summer.

Demographics

2020 census

As of the 2020 United States census, there were 13,297 people, 3,774 households, and 2,796 families residing in the town.

2000 census
As of the census of 2000, there were 5,952 people, 2,103 households, and 1,491 families residing in the town. The population density was 1,333.1 people per square mile (515.3/km2). There were 2,334 housing units at an average density of 522.8 per square mile (202.1/km2). The racial makeup of the town was 57.33% White, 36.59% African American, 0.64% Native American, 0.55% Asian, 0.05% Pacific Islander, 2.97% from other races, and 1.86% from two or more races. Hispanic or Latino of any race were 4.20% of the population.

There were 2,103 households, out of which 40.6% had children under the age of 18 living with them, 43.6% were married couples living together, 23.1% had a female householder with no husband present, and 29.1% were non-families. 25.6% of all households were made up of individuals, and 9.6% had someone living alone who was 65 years of age or older. The average household size was 2.61 and the average family size was 3.09.

In the town, the population was spread out, with 28.9% under the age of 18, 10.5% from 18 to 24, 30.0% from 25 to 44, 18.1% from 45 to 64, and 12.5% who were 65 years of age or older. The median age was 32 years. For every 100 females, there were 87.5 males. For every 100 females age 18 and over, there were 81.8 males.

The median income for a household in the town was $31,711, and the median income for a family was $37,335. Males had a median income of $30,634 versus $21,796 for females. The per capita income for the town was $15,202. About 16.5% of families and 17.6% of the population were below the poverty line, including 26.6% of those under age 18 and 11.7% of those age 65 or over.

Education
Moncks Corner has a public library, a branch of the Berkeley County Library System.

Notable people

 Omar Brown, National Football League (NFL) player
 Charlamagne tha God (born 1978), radio and TV personality
 Andre Ellington, NFL player
 Bruce Ellington (born 1991), NFL player
 Steven Furtick, pastor of Elevation Church
 Willie J. Hill Jr. (born 1951), bishop of the Reformed Episcopal Church Diocese of the Southeast
 Robin Kenyatta, jazz musician
 Ryan Stewart, NFL player, 2 Live Stews radio personality with brother Doug
 Isaac Wright Jr. (born 1962), lawyer
 Kwame Brown, basketball player
 Kathryn Dennis, Reality TV Star (Southern Charm)

References

External links
 
 Town of Moncks Corner official website
 Old Santee Canal Park
 Berkeley County School District

French-American culture in South Carolina
Huguenot history in the United States
Towns in South Carolina
Towns in Berkeley County, South Carolina
County seats in South Carolina
Charleston–North Charleston–Summerville metropolitan area